Damyan Hristov (Bulgarian: Дамян Христов; born 10 November 2002) is a Bulgarian footballer who plays as a goalkeeper for Ludogorets Razgrad.

Career
Hristov completed his league debut for Ludogorets Razgrad on 26 May 2021 in a match against CSKA 1948.

References

External links
 

2002 births
Living people
Bulgarian footballers
Bulgaria under-21 international footballers
Bulgaria youth international footballers
PFC Ludogorets Razgrad II players
PFC Ludogorets Razgrad players
First Professional Football League (Bulgaria) players
Association football goalkeepers